Basil Bhuriya (8 March 1956 in Panchkula – 6 May 2021 in Indore) was an Indian Roman Catholic bishop.

Bhuriya was born in Panchkula and was ordained to the priesthood in 1986. He served as bishop of the Roman Catholic Diocese of Jhabua, India, from 2016 until his death in 2021, from COVID-19 at age 65.

Notes

1956 births
2021 deaths
21st-century Roman Catholic bishops in India
People from Jhabua district
Deaths from the COVID-19 pandemic in India